Bob Lymburne (born 30 July 1909, date of death unknown) was a Canadian ski jumper.

Career
Lymburne competed in the individual event at the 1932 Winter Olympics. In 1935, he suffered a severe head injury while ski jumping. At some point after 1957, he wandered into the woods and was not seen again.

Ski jumping world records

 Not recognized. Stood at world record distance at unofficial competition. Amateur WR.

See also
 List of people who disappeared

References

External links
 

1909 births
1950s missing person cases
Canadian male ski jumpers
Missing person cases in Canada
Olympic ski jumpers of Canada
Ski jumpers at the 1932 Winter Olympics
Year of death missing